This is a list of the mammal species recorded in Eswatini. There are 107 mammal species in Eswatini, of which one is critically endangered, two are endangered, five are vulnerable, and four are near threatened.

The following tags are used to highlight each species' conservation status as assessed by the International Union for Conservation of Nature:

Some species were assessed using an earlier set of criteria. Species assessed using this system have the following instead of near threatened and least concern categories:

Order: Afrosoricida (tenrecs and golden moles) 
The order Afrosoricida contains the golden moles of southern Africa and the tenrecs of Madagascar and Africa, two families of small mammals that were traditionally part of the order Insectivora.

Family: Chrysochloridae
Subfamily: Amblysominae
Genus: Amblysomus
 Hottentot golden mole, Amblysomus hottentotus LC
 Marley's golden mole, Amblysomus marleyi EN
 Highveld golden mole, Amblysomus septentrionalis NT

Order: Pholidota (pangolins) 

The order Pholidota comprises the eight species of pangolin. Pangolins are anteaters and have the powerful claws, elongated snout and long tongue seen in the other unrelated anteater species.

Family: Manidae
Genus: Smutsia
 Ground pangolin, S. temminckii VU possibly extirpated

Order: Hyracoidea (hyraxes) 

The hyraxes are any of four species of fairly small, thickset, herbivorous mammals in the order Hyracoidea. About the size of a domestic cat they are well-furred, with rounded bodies and a stumpy tail. They are native to Africa and the Middle East.

Family: Procaviidae (hyraxes)
Genus: Procavia
 Cape hyrax, P. capensis

Order: Proboscidea (elephants) 

The elephants comprise three living species and are the largest living land animals.
Family: Elephantidae (elephants)
Genus: Loxodonta
African bush elephant, L. africana  reintroduced

Order: Primates 

The order Primates contains humans and their closest relatives: lemurs, lorisoids, tarsiers, monkeys, and apes.

Suborder: Strepsirrhini
Infraorder: Lemuriformes
Superfamily: Lorisidae
Family: Galagidae
Genus: Galago
 Mohol bushbaby, G. moholi 
Genus: Otolemur
 Brown greater galago, Otolemur crassicaudatus LR/lc
Suborder: Haplorhini
Infraorder: Simiiformes
Parvorder: Catarrhini
Superfamily: Cercopithecoidea
Family: Cercopithecidae (Old World monkeys)
Genus: Chlorocebus
 Vervet monkey, Chlorocebus pygerythrus LR/lc
Genus: Cercopithecus
 Blue monkey, Cercopithecus mitis LR/lc
Genus: Papio
 Chacma baboon, Papio ursinus LR/lc

Order: Rodentia (rodents) 
Rodents make up the largest order of mammals, with over 40% of mammalian species. They have two incisors in the upper and lower jaw which grow continually and must be kept short by gnawing.

Suborder: Hystricognathi
Family: Bathyergidae
Genus: Cryptomys
 Common mole-rat, Cryptomys hottentotus LC
Family: Hystricidae (Old World porcupines)
Genus: Hystrix
 Cape porcupine, Hystrix africaeaustralis LC
Family: Thryonomyidae (cane rats)
Genus: Thryonomys
 Greater cane rat, Thryonomys swinderianus LC
Suborder: Sciurognathi
Family: Gliridae (dormice)
Subfamily: Graphiurinae
Genus: Graphiurus
 Small-eared dormouse, Graphiurus microtis LC
 Rock dormouse, Graphiurus platyops LC
Family: Nesomyidae
Subfamily: Dendromurinae
Genus: Dendromus
 Gray climbing mouse, Dendromus melanotis LC
 Chestnut climbing mouse, Dendromus mystacalis LC
Subfamily: Cricetomyinae
Genus: Saccostomus
 South African pouched mouse, Saccostomus campestris LC
Family: Muridae (mice, rats, voles, gerbils, hamsters, etc.)
Subfamily: Otomyinae
Genus: Otomys
 Angoni vlei rat, Otomys angoniensis LC
 Vlei rat, Otomys irroratus LC
Subfamily: Gerbillinae
Genus: Tatera
 Highveld gerbil, Tatera brantsii LC
 Bushveld gerbil, Tatera leucogaster LC
Subfamily: Murinae
Genus: Aethomys
 Tete veld aethomys, Aethomys ineptus LC
 Namaqua rock rat, Aethomys namaquensis LC
Genus: Grammomys
 Woodland thicket rat, Grammomys dolichurus LC
Genus: Lemniscomys
 Single-striped grass mouse, Lemniscomys rosalia LC
Genus: Mastomys
 Natal multimammate mouse, Mastomys natalensis LC
Genus: Mus
 African pygmy mouse, Mus minutoides LC
Genus: Rhabdomys
 Four-striped grass mouse, Rhabdomys pumilio LC
Genus: Thallomys
 Acacia rat, Thallomys paedulcus LC

Order: Lagomorpha (lagomorphs) 
The lagomorphs comprise two families, Leporidae (hares and rabbits), and Ochotonidae (pikas). Though they can resemble rodents, and were classified as a superfamily in that order until the early 20th century, they have since been considered a separate order. They differ from rodents in a number of physical characteristics, such as having four incisors in the upper jaw rather than two.

Family: Leporidae (rabbits, hares)
Genus: Lepus
 Cape hare, Lepus capensis LR/lc

Order: Soricomorpha (shrews, moles, and solenodons) 
The "shrew-forms" are insectivorous mammals. The shrews and solenodons closely resemble mice while the moles are stout-bodied burrowers.

Family: Soricidae (shrews)
Subfamily: Crocidurinae
Genus: Crocidura
 Reddish-gray musk shrew, Crocidura cyanea LC
 Greater red musk shrew, Crocidura flavescens LC
 Lesser red musk shrew, Crocidura hirta LC
 Maquassie musk shrew, Crocidura maquassiensis LC
 Swamp musk shrew, Crocidura mariquensis LC
 Lesser gray-brown musk shrew, Crocidura silacea LC
Genus: Suncus
 Least dwarf shrew, Suncus infinitesimus LC
Subfamily: Myosoricinae
Genus: Myosorex
 Dark-footed forest shrew, Myosorex cafer LC
 Forest shrew, Myosorex varius LC

Order: Chiroptera (bats) 
The bats' most distinguishing feature is that their forelimbs are developed as wings, making them the only mammals capable of flight. Bat species account for about 20% of all mammals.
Family: Pteropodidae (flying foxes, Old World fruit bats)
Subfamily: Pteropodinae
Genus: Eidolon
 Straw-coloured fruit bat, Eidolon helvum LC
Genus: Epomophorus
 Peters's epauletted fruit bat, Epomophorus crypturus LC
 Wahlberg's epauletted fruit bat, Epomophorus wahlbergi LC
Genus: Rousettus
 Egyptian fruit bat, Rousettus aegyptiacus LC
Family: Vespertilionidae
Subfamily: Kerivoulinae
Genus: Kerivoula
 Damara woolly bat, Kerivoula argentata LC
Subfamily: Myotinae
Genus: Myotis
 Cape hairy bat, Myotis tricolor LC
Subfamily: Vespertilioninae
Genus: Glauconycteris
 Butterfly bat, Glauconycteris variegata LC
Genus: Neoromicia
 Cape serotine, Neoromicia capensis LC
 Banana pipistrelle, Neoromicia nanus LC
Genus: Nycticeinops
 Schlieffen's bat, Nycticeinops schlieffeni LC
Genus: Scotophilus
 African yellow bat, Scotophilus dinganii LC
Subfamily: Miniopterinae
Genus: Miniopterus
 Lesser long-fingered bat, Miniopterus fraterculus LC
 Natal long-fingered bat, Miniopterus natalensis NT
Family: Molossidae
Genus: Chaerephon
 Little free-tailed bat, Chaerephon pumila LC
Genus: Mops
 Angolan free-tailed bat, Mops condylurus LC
Family: Emballonuridae
Genus: Taphozous
 Mauritian tomb bat, Taphozous mauritianus LC
Family: Nycteridae
Genus: Nycteris
 Egyptian slit-faced bat, Nycteris thebaica LC
Family: Rhinolophidae
Subfamily: Rhinolophinae
Genus: Rhinolophus
Blasius's horseshoe bat, R. blasii 
 Geoffroy's horseshoe bat, Rhinolophus clivosus LC
 Darling's horseshoe bat, Rhinolophus darlingi LC
 Bushveld horseshoe bat, Rhinolophus simulator LC
Subfamily: Hipposiderinae
Genus: Cloeotis
 Percival's trident bat, Cloeotis percivali VU
Genus: Hipposideros
 Sundevall's roundleaf bat, Hipposideros caffer LC

Order: Carnivora (carnivorans) 

There are over 260 species of carnivorans, the majority of which feed primarily on meat. They have a characteristic skull shape and dentition.
Suborder: Feliformia
Family: Felidae (cats)
Subfamily: Felinae
Genus: Acinonyx
Cheetah, A. jubatus 
Genus: Caracal
Caracal, C. caracal 
Genus: Felis
African wildcat, F. lybica 
Genus: Leptailurus
Serval, L. serval 
Subfamily: Pantherinae
Genus: Panthera
Lion, P. leo 
Leopard, P. pardus 
Family: Hyaenidae (hyaenas)
Genus: Parahyaena
Brown hyena, P. brunnea  presence uncertain
Genus: Proteles
Aardwolf, P. cristata 
Suborder: Caniformia
Family: Canidae (dogs, foxes)
Genus: Lupulella
 Side-striped jackal, L. adusta  
 Black-backed jackal, L. mesomelas  
Genus: Lycaon
African wild dog, L. pictus  extirpated
Family: Mustelidae (mustelids)
Genus: Ictonyx
Striped polecat, I. striatus 
Genus: Mellivora
Honey badger, M. capensis 
Genus: Aonyx
African clawless otter, A. capensis

Order: Perissodactyla (odd-toed ungulates) 
The odd-toed ungulates are browsing and grazing mammals. They are usually large to very large, and have relatively simple stomachs and a large middle toe.

Family: Equidae (horses etc.)
Genus: Equus
Plains zebra, E. quagga 
Burchell's zebra, E. q. burchellii 
Selous' zebra, E. q. selousi 
Family: Rhinocerotidae
Genus: Diceros
Black rhinoceros, D. bicornis 
South-central black rhinoceros, D. b. minor  reintroduced
Genus: Ceratotherium
White rhinoceros, c. simum
Southern white rhinoceros, C. s. simum

Order: Artiodactyla (even-toed ungulates) 

The even-toed ungulates are ungulates whose weight is borne about equally by the third and fourth toes, rather than mostly or entirely by the third as in perissodactyls. There are about 220 artiodactyl species, including many that are of great economic importance to humans.
Family: Suidae (pigs)
Subfamily: Phacochoerinae
Genus: Phacochoerus
 Common warthog, Phacochoerus africanus
Subfamily: Suinae
Genus: Potamochoerus
 Bushpig, Potamochoerus larvatus
Family: Hippopotamidae (hippopotamuses)
Genus: Hippopotamus
 Hippopotamus, Hippopotamus amphibius VU
Family: Giraffidae (giraffe, okapi)
Genus: Giraffa
 Giraffe, Giraffa camelopardalis VU introduced
Family: Bovidae (cattle, antelope, sheep, goats)
Subfamily: Alcelaphinae
Genus: Alcelaphus
 Hartebeest, Alcelaphus buselaphus LC introduced
Genus: Connochaetes
 Black wildebeest, Connochaetes gnou LC
 Blue wildebeest, Connochaetes taurinus
Genus: Damaliscus
 Topi, Damaliscus lunatus
 Bontebok, Damaliscus pygargus
Subfamily: Antilopinae
Genus: Oreotragus
 Klipspringer, Oreotragus oreotragus
Genus: Ourebia
 Oribi, Ourebia ourebi
Genus: Raphicerus
 Steenbok, Raphicerus campestris
 Sharpe's grysbok, Raphicerus sharpei
Subfamily: Bovinae
Genus: Syncerus
African buffalo, S. caffer  reintroduced
Genus: Tragelaphus
 Nyala, Tragelaphus angasii reintroduced
 Common eland, Tragelaphus oryx
 Bushbuck, Tragelaphus scriptus
 Greater kudu, Tragelaphus strepsiceros
Subfamily: Cephalophinae
Genus: Cephalophus
 Blue duiker, Cephalophus monticola
 Red forest duiker, Cephalophus natalensis
Genus: Sylvicapra
 Common duiker, Sylvicapra grimmia
Subfamily: Hippotraginae
Genus: Hippotragus
 Roan antelope, Hippotragus equinusLC reintroduced
 Sable antelope, Hippotragus niger LC introduced
Subfamily: Peleinae
Genus: Pelea
 Grey rhebok, Pelea capreolus LC
Subfamily: Aepycerotinae
Genus: Aepyceros
 Impala, Aepyceros melampus
Subfamily: Reduncinae
Genus: Kobus
 Waterbuck, Kobus ellipsiprymnus
Genus: Redunca
 Southern reedbuck, Redunca arundinum
 Mountain reedbuck, Redunca fulvorufula LC

See also
List of chordate orders
Lists of mammals by region
List of prehistoric mammals
Mammal classification
List of mammals described in the 2000s

References

External links

Eswatini
Eswatini
Mammals